Khormai (also Romanized as Khormā’ī; also known as Hormā’ī, Khowrmeh, and Khūrmai) is a village in Farmeshkhan Rural District, in the Central District of Kavar County, Fars Province, Iran. At the 2006 census, its population was 116, in 28 families.

References 

Populated places in Kavar County